Pu Cunxin (born 31 July 1953), also known as Pu Quanxin, is a Chinese actor who has served as Chairman of China Theatre Association since July 2015. He is or was  a member of the Beijing Experimental Theater Troupe.

Biography
Pu had a rough childhood. He could not walk normally because he had poliomyelitis when he was 2 year old. Pu's classmates always made fun of him, called him "Pu cripple". At the age of 9, Pu received a surgery for his leg, enabling him to walk normally. He was sad about his nickname, but he never gave up on his life or blamed anyone, he worked hard on everything to prove that he was as good as his peers. He said, "I can walk normally without walking stick after 9 years old. I wanted to leave the school as soon as possible so that none can ever call me 'Pu Cripple'. It was obvious hurts me. But the most important thing is I have to face myself, now I can run and play basketball just like others." 
The reason he became an actor is because of his father. Pu' father (Su min, Chinese name: 苏民) was a famous actor in Beijing. Pu always followed his father to the theater for his performances. Pu fell in love with acting day by day, eventually becoming an actor himself.

He became the chairman of China Theatre Association in July 2015, and was re-elected in December 2020. In December 2016, he was elected vice-president of China Federation of Literary and Art Circles.

Book
Pu wrote an autobiography in 2008 called “I know where the light is” (Chinese: 我知道光在哪里) In the autobiography, he wrote 3 session about his childhood, how he became an actor, and after he became an actor.

Philanthropy
Pu is also a philanthropist. In 2002, he received a reward from Moving China (a program held by China Central Television annually) as one of the persons who most inspired China during that year, because he has made great contribution to AIDS prevention.
Pu founded "Pu Cunxin Loving fund" to help children in poor areas receive education and/or medical treatment. In 2013, he donated blood for the 11th time at the age of 60.

Filmography

Films

References

External links 
 
Pu Cunxin at the Chinese Movie Database

Male actors from Beijing
Living people
1953 births
Chinese male stage actors
Chinese male film actors
Chinese male television actors
Chinese male voice actors